Li Zhe (born September 20, 1986) is a Chinese tennis player who plays mainly in the ATP Challenger and ITF Futures Tours. On 11 November 2019, he reached his highest ATP singles ranking of world No. 193. His highest doubles ranking of world No. 136 was achieved on 28 February 2011.

Personal
Li Zhe was born in Tianjin, China on September 20, 1986. He began playing tennis at age 8 and turned professional in 2004. He plays right-handed, and his favorite surface is hard court. He is 6 feet, 1 inch (185 cm) and 178 pounds (81 kg). His goal as a professional tennis player is to enter the top 100 ranked tennis players in the world.

Career
In December 2018 Li defeated his compatriot Ze Zhang in three sets to win the 2019 Australian Open Asia-Pac Wildcard Play-off, which secured a wildcard place for him to make his grand slam singles debut at age 32 at the 2019 Australian Open.

Li represents his native country of China competing during the Davis Cup. He competes in both singles. for which he has a record of 6–3, and doubles which his record is 5–8, for a combined total record of 11–11. He has reached 27 career singles finals, boasting a record of 14 wins and 13 losses, including a 0–2 record in ATP Challenger finals. Additionally he has reached a bountiful 81 doubles finals with a record of 53 wins and 28 losses, including a  6–7 record in ATP Challenger finals.

ATP Challenger and ITF Futures Finals

Singles: 27 (14–13)

Doubles: 81 (53–28)

Performance timeline

Singles

Rankings

Year end ATP rankings

Sponsorship
In November 2010, Zhe Li signed as a spokesperson for Dunlop Sport, after gaining recognition as the captain of the Chinese national men's tennis team and winning the China Tennis Grand Prix men's doubles title.

References

External links 

1986 births
Living people
Chinese male tennis players
Tennis players at the 2006 Asian Games
Tennis players at the 2010 Asian Games
Tennis players at the 2014 Asian Games
Tennis players at the 2018 Asian Games
Asian Games medalists in tennis
Medalists at the 2010 Asian Games
Medalists at the 2014 Asian Games
Asian Games silver medalists for China
Tennis players from Tianjin